Christ in the Storm on the Sea of Galilee is a 1633 oil-on-canvas painting by the Dutch Golden Age painter Rembrandt van Rijn. It was previously in the Isabella Stewart Gardner Museum in Boston but was stolen in 1990 and remains missing. The painting depicts the biblical story of Jesus calming the storm on the Sea of Galilee, specifically as it is described in the fourth chapter of the Gospel of Mark.  It is Rembrandt's only seascape.

Description
The painting, in vertical format, shows a close-up view of Christ's disciples struggling frantically against the heavy storm to regain control of their fishing boat. A huge wave beats the bow and rips the sail. One of the disciples is seen vomiting over the side. Another one, looking directly out at the viewer, is a self-portrait of the artist.  Only Christ, depicted on the right, remains calm.

The close-up treatment of the subject and the overall composition go back to the print made by Adriaen Collaert after a design by the Flemish artist Maerten de Vos. That print depicting The storm on the sea of Galilei was plate 8 in the 12-part Vita, passio et Resvrrectio Iesv Christ which was published by Jan and Raphael Sadeler in Antwerp in 1583.   Rembrandt's painting follows the portrait format in his composition and also depicts the boat in a forward tilting position. Like in the print, most of the space of the work is taken up by the main motif, which is the disciples on the boat struggling against the elements.

Theft

On the morning of March 18, 1990, two thieves disguised as police officers broke into the museum and stole The Storm on the Sea of Galilee and 12 other works  in what is considered to be the biggest art theft in U.S. history. The heist remains unsolved.

On March 18, 2013, the FBI announced that they knew who was responsible for the crime.

See also
 List of stolen paintings

References

External links

1633 paintings
Maritime paintings
Paintings by Rembrandt
Storm on the Sea of Galilee
Stolen works of art
Paintings of apostles
Sea of Galilee